Cecilioides sommeri is a fossil species of minute air-breathing land snail, a terrestrial pulmonate gastropod mollusk in the family Ferussaciidae, from the Paleocene deposits of the Itaboraí Basin, in Brazil. This is the oldest known species in the family.

References

Ferussaciidae
Prehistoric gastropods
Gastropods described in 1971